EDC Paris Business School, also called Ecole des Dirigeants et des Créateurs d'entreprise,
is a French business School in the city of Paris  located in the business district La Défense. It offers four complete programs in English at undergraduate, graduate and post graduate levels (luxury brand management)
Its MBA Luxury Brand Marketing and International Management is ranked 9th worldwide by Eduniversal.  In partnership with the jewellery house Cartier, EDC created Sup de Luxe, a school offering programmes in luxury management.  

Established in 1950, EDC Paris Business School provides business and management courses to 1300 students, both in French and in English. 

The school is ranked among the best 20 Business Schools in France by Le figaro.

Admissions
French students, unless they have studied abroad, must succeed at a competitive entrance examination, known as the concours. There are two concours, depending on undergraduate studies:Concours Link (2450 candidates in 2014 for 250 selected)

250 places are offered to the best student after the Baccalauréat (High school diploma)

Concours Passerelle (7400 candidates in 2014 for 2 800 selected)
 60 places for 1 500 selected are offered to the best students holding a BTS, DUT or classes préparatoires aux grandes écoles for 3 years.
 40 places for 1 300 selected are offered to the best students holding a bachelor's degree or a Licence program for 2 years.

Their curriculum includes a written examination with 4 test: literary essay on an economic subject, test arpeggio (general knowledge, memorization, algebra, logic), English test and Test in the choice (Mathematics, management, law, economy, management, marketing, philosophy) and then an oral examinations: English Test, interview in Spanish or in German and then an important interview in every school of the concours in front of professional's jury (ex: CEO).

World Partner universities 
San Diego Alliant International University (US)  Dual degrees
Santa Barbara College (US)  Dual degrees
Curtin University (Australia)  Dual degrees
West Saxon University (Netherlands)  Dual degrees
Bucharest Academy of Economic Studies (Romania)  Dual degrees
Montesquieu University (France)  Dual degrees
Paris West University Nanterre (France)   Dual degrees

Sup De Luxe 
The Institut Supérieur de Marketing du Luxe was founded by Alain-Dominique Perrin, in collaboration with Cartier in 1990. By creating the Institut Supérieur de Marketing du Luxe, Cartier first trained a large number of its managers and then offered other brands creative profiles with the values of the sector. 

Sup de luxe was the first educational institute in France specialising in the luxury management. The absence of luxury management schools is what gave Perrin his initial idea of founding the school. Its initial aim was to produce young managers and experts in the luxury field and to stimulate research into luxury on a global scale.

Notable EDC Paris Business School faculty, staff and owner
Some names of the list:

Alain-Dominique Perrin, ex President of Richemont and President of EDC Paris Business School.
Robert Louis-Dreyfus, Businessman and CEO of Adidas-Salomon 
Jean Todt, motor sport executive
Jean Marcel Jammet, Director of EDC Paris Business School
Michel Trollé, founder of Century 21
Antoine Hébrard, CEO of Who's Who in France
Didier Vuchot, Président of Europe de Kornferry
Bertrand Delamarre, CEO of Call Expert
Didier Rosenberg, Founding partner of Datawords

History
Founded in 1950, EDC PARIS is one of the oldest business schools in France.

Accreditations and associations
Sourced from EDC Paris Business School Programme

 Fully accredited by the French Ministry of Education and Research, it delivers a state-approved Master's degree in business studies.
Accredited by European Foundation for Management Development (EFMD)Member of the Conférence des Grandes Écoles
 Member of the Fondation Nationale pour l’Enseignement de la Gestion des Entreprises (FNEGE)
 Member of the NAFSA Association of International Educators
 Member of the EAIE (European Association for International Education)
 Member of ERASMUS 
 Member of Campus France
 Member of the Association to Advance Collegiate Schools of Business (AACSB International)
 Partnership of Incubateur de l’École Nationale Supérieure des Arts et Métiers (ENSAM) (Produced in Brittany)
 Member of Campus responsables

References

Business schools in France
Universities in Paris